Raphaël Sévère born 15 September 1994 in Rennes, is a French clarinettist.

Biography

After winning the Tokyo Competition at the age of twelve and gaining a nomination as ‘Solo Instrumental Discovery’ at the Victoires de la Musique Classique when aged fifteen, Raphaël Sévère went on to win the prestigious Young Concerts Artists International Auditions in New York in November 2013, where he was awarded First Prize and eight special prizes.

Aged 8, he took up the clarinet at the Conservatoire de Nantes. At 14, he was admitted to the Conservatoire National Supérieur de Musique of Paris where he obtained in June 2013 the master of arts degree with high honors.

Raphaël Sévère has been invited to play as a soloist with French orchestras (Orchestre de chambre de Paris, Orchestre national d'Île-de-France, Orchestre National Bordeaux Aquitaine, Orchestre National du Capitole de Toulouse, Orchestre National de Lille, Orchestre Philharmonique de Strasbourg, Orchestre National des Pays de la Loire) and internationally with National Philharmonic of Russia, Deutsches Symphonie-Orchester Berlin, Konzerthausorchester Berlin, Budapest Strings Chamber Orchestra, Württemberg Chamber Orchestra, Polish Chamber Orchestra, Sinfonia Varsovia, London Philharmonic Orchestra, Orchestra of St Luke's, Edmonton Symphony Orchestra, Hong Kong Sinfonietta, Korean National Symphony Orchestra. 

He performed at Berlin Philharmonie, Théâtre des Champs Elysées, Auditorium du Louvre, KKL Lucerne, New York Alice Tully Hall, Seoul Arts Center.

In the field of chamber music, he performed with Pražák Quartet, Modigliani Quartet, Quatuor Ébène, Trio Les Esprits, Martha Argerich, Boris Berezovsky, Jean-Frédéric Neuburger, Adam Laloum, Gidon Kremer, Renaud Capuçon, David Grimal, Gérard Caussé, Antoine Tamestit, Gary Hoffman, Xavier Phillips.

He regularly performs with pianist Adam Laloum and cellist Victor Julien-Laferrière with whom he recorded a Brahms CD (Mirare) that was rewarded Diapason d'Or of the year 2015 in Diapason magazine.

Always attracted by creation and himself a composer, his works are published by L'empreinte mélodique.

Compositions 
Obscurs for clarinet and guitar (premiered in Festival Européen Jeunes Talents in Paris in July 2015).
Entre les liens for clarinet and piano (commissioned by the Festival Musicades et Olivades and premiered in Saint-Rémy de Provence in July 2018).
Sept Miniatures for piano (premiered in Paris salle Cortot by Paul Montag in February 2019).
Entre chien et Loup for guitar (commissioned by Antoine Morinière and premiered in Vienna in July 2019).
Mojenn, legend for clarinet and orchestra (commissioned by the Orchestre National de Bretagne and premiered in Rennes in March 2020).
Le pont d'Arcole for violin, cello, piano (commissioned by the Festival Européen Jeunes talents and premiered in Paris by the Trio Karénine in July 2020).
Orages d'acier for violin, clarinet, piano (commissioned by Théâtre La Scala and premiered in Paris in October 2020).
Partita for strings trio (commissioned by the Festival Européen Jeunes talents and premiered in Paris in May 2021 by the Trio Sypniewski).
La 7e preuve for soprano saxophone and piano (commissioned by Valentine Michaud and premiered in Festival Radio France Occitanie Montpellier in July 2022 by the Akmi Duo).

Discography
 Récital de musique française, Hort 536, live concert held on 23 June 2007 in Cholet. Works by Poulenc, Saint-Saëns, Claude Debussy, Ernest Chausson, Gabriel Pierné  with Tünde Hajdu, pianist. Awards :  Diapason (4 stars), Classic Info Disque (Revelation), Classica Repertoire (Discovery).
 Opus 2, Thys 004, July 2010. Works by Bohuslav Martinu, Emil Cossetto, Sergei Taneïev, Witold Lutoslawski, Zoltán Kodály, Malcolm Arnold, Arthur Honegger, Ferruccio Busoni, Jean Françaix with Tünde Hajdu, pianist. Awards : Diapason (5 stars).
 Folksongs, Naïve V5365, May 2014. Vocal works by Berio, Brahms, Falla, Granados, Obradors with Nora Gubisch, mezzo-soprano and Alain Altinoglu, pianist and conductor. Awards : Télérama (Event ffff).
 Brahms, Mirare 250, September 2014. Trio op.114 and sonatas op.120 with Victor Julien-Laferrière, cello and Adam Laloum, piano. Awards : Diapason (Diapason d'Or), Télérama (Event ffff).
 Brahms, Hindemith, Mirare 282, November 2015 : Quintets by Brahms and Hindemith with Prazák Quartet. Awards : Diapason (5 stars), Télérama (Event ffff), France Musique (The selection).
 Weber, Mirare 372, September 2017 : Concerto opus 73, Variations opus 33, Grand Duo opus 48 with Deutsches Symphonie-Orchester Berlin (dir. Aziz Shokhakimov) and Jean-Frédéric Neuburger, piano. Awards : Diapason (5 stars).
Messiaen, Ades, Mirare 334, November 2018 : Quatuor pour la fin du temps by Messiaen and Court studies by Ades with Trio Messiaen. Awards : Diapason (Diapason d'Or), Classica (Choc), France Musique (The selection), Le Monde, ResMusica.
On tour, Mirare 498, October 2019 : works for clarinet and piano by Lutoslawski, Poulenc, Weiner, Bartok, Sévère, Bernstein with Paul Montag, pianist. Awards : Diapason (5 stars), France Info (Sélection culture).

References

External links 
Official website

1994 births
Musicians from Rennes
21st-century French musicians
French classical clarinetists
21st-century clarinetists
Conservatoire de Paris alumni
Classical clarinetists
Living people
21st-century classical musicians
21st-century French male musicians